Tory Food Co, Ltd. (hangul:토리식품) is a Korean food company. Headquartered in Dongmak-ri, Gonggeom-myeon, Sangju, Gyeongsangbuk-do, it was established in 2001. It manufactures living food products and food under the brand Arirang Torirang (아리랑 토리랑).

Products
Sauce and ketchup
Curry powder
Other products - Aricon Toricon, Arirang Torirang pumpkin soup, hot cake powder

See also
Economy of South Korea

References

External links
Tory Food Homepage 

Food and drink companies of South Korea
Food manufacturers of South Korea
Food and drink companies established in 2001
South Korean companies established in 2001
Companies based in North Gyeongsang Province
Sangju